Roush Creek Falls is a steep cascade in North Cascades National Park, Washington, U.S.  Glacial melt waters from Eldorado Glacier flow south creating Roush Creek.

References 

Waterfalls of Washington (state)
North Cascades National Park
Landforms of Skagit County, Washington